Urban Farmer is a chain of four restaurants in Cleveland, Denver, Philadelphia, and Portland, Oregon.

Locations
The Cleveland restaurant is housed in the Westin Cleveland Downtown Hotel.

The Denver restaurant opened in the Oxford Hotel in 2017.

The Portland restaurant operates from the eighth floor of The Nines, a hotel in downtown Portland's Meier & Frank Building. In 2009, The Oregonian David Sarasohn gave the restaurant a 'B−' rating. Urban Farmer closed during the COVID-19 pandemic, but reopened on August 13, 2020.

References

External links
 

Restaurants in Denver
Restaurants in Ohio
Restaurants in Philadelphia
Steakhouses in the United States
Steakhouses in Portland, Oregon